Garage is the third studio album by American country rock group Cross Canadian Ragweed. A limited release special edition included a bonus DVD containing six videos, one chronicling the band's 10th anniversary. The album includes the singles "Fightin' For" and "This Time Around", both of which charted on Hot Country Songs. The album also produced the song "Dimebag", a tribute to former Damageplan guitarist Darrell Abbott, who had been killed during a performance earlier in the year. The single, along with "Fighting For" both saw air time on classic rock stations in both Texas and Oklahoma. Lead singer Cody Canada agreed, saying that Garage was "our grungiest album so far......we named it Garage because we wanted to make a record that sounded like a garage rock band."

Track listing

Chart performance

Cross Canadian Ragweed albums
2005 albums
Show Dog-Universal Music albums